Lanthanide trichlorides are a family of inorganic compound with the formula LnCl3, where Ln stands for a lanthanide metal. The trichlorides are standard reagents in applied and academic chemistry of the lanthanides.  They exist as anhydrous solids and as hydrates.

Properties
The anhydrous solids have melting points range from ca. 582 (Tb) - 925 °C (Lu).  They are generally pale colored, often white.  As coordination polymers, they only dissolve in donor solvents, including water.

Preparation
The lanthanide oxides and carbonates dissolve in hydrochloric acid to give chloride salt of the hydrated cations:
M2O3  + 6HCl  +  n H2O  →   2[Ln(H2O)n]Cl3

Industrial routes
Anhydrous trichlorides are produced commercially by carbothermic reaction of the oxide:
M2O3  +  3Cl2   +  3C  →   2MCl3  +  3CO

Ammonium chloride route
The ammonium chloride route refers to a general procedure to produce anhydrous lanthanide chlorides.  The method has the advantages of being general for the 14 lanthanides and it produces air-stable intermediates that resist hydrolysis.  The use of ammonium chloride as a reagent is convenient because the salt is anhydrous, even when handled in air.  Ammonium chloride is also attractive because it thermally decomposes to volatile products at temperatures compatible with the stability of the trichloride targets. 

Step 1 preparation of ammonium lanthanide chlorides
The reaction of an intimate mixture of lanthanide oxides with excess ammonium chloride produces anhydrous ammonium salts of the penta- and hexachlorides. Typical reaction conditions are hours at 230-250 °C. Some lanthanides (as well as scandium and yttrium) form pentachlorides:
M2O3  +  10NH4Cl  →   2(NH4)2MCl5  +  3H2O  +  6NH3
(M = Dy, Ho, Er, Tm, Lu, Yb, Y, Sc)
Tb4O7  +  22NH4Cl  →   4(NH4)2TbCl5  +  7H2O  +  14NH3

Other lanthanides for hexachlorides:
M2O3  +  12NH4Cl  →   2(NH4)3MCl6  +  3H2O  +  6NH3
(M = La, Ce, Nd, Pm, Sm, Eu, Gd)
Pr6O11  +  40NH4Cl  →   6(NH4)3PrCl6  +  11H2O  +  22NH3

These reactions can also start with the metals, e.g.:
Y +  5NH4Cl   →   (NH4)2YCl5  +  1.5H2  + 3NH3

Step 2 thermolysis of ammonium lanthanide chlorides
The ammonium lanthanum chlorides are converted to the trichlorides by heating in a vacuum.  Typical reaction temperatures are 350–400 °C:
(NH4)2MCl5   →   MCl3  +  2HCl  +  2NH3
(NH4)3MCl6  →   MCl3  +  3HCl  +  3NH3

Other methods
Hydrated lanthanide trichlorides dehydrate under a hot stream of hydrogen chloride.

Structures

As indicated in the table, the anhydrous trichlorides follow two main motifs, UCl3 and YCl3.  The UCl3 structure features 9-coordinate metal centers.  The PuBr3 structure, adopted uniquely by TbCl3, features 8-coordinated metals.  The remaining later metals are 6-coordinate as is aluminium trichloride.

Reactions
Lanthanide trichlorides are commercial precursors to the metals by reduction, e.g. with aluminium:
LnCl3  +  Al  →  Ln  +  AlCl3
In some cases, the trifluoride is preferred.

They react with humid air to give oxychlorides:
LnCl3  +  H2O  → LnOCl  +  2 HCl
For synthetic chemists, this reaction is a problematic since the oxychlorides are less reactive.

References

Chlorides
Lanthanum compounds
Lanthanide halides